Coast Guard Air Station North Bend (CGAS North Bend) was established September 28, 1974 at Southwest Oregon Regional Airport in North Bend, Oregon, United States.  The unit houses 153 active duty, nine reserve duty and five civilian personnel.  The unit operates five Eurocopter HH-65 Dolphin helicopters.  CGAS North Bend received its first upgraded HH-65C Dolphin in 2007   The unit functions include search and rescue, law enforcement, marine environmental protection, aids to navigation, and enforcement of federal treaties.

References

External links
 CGAS North Bend website

United States Coast Guard Air Stations
Military installations in Oregon
Transportation in Coos County, Oregon
Buildings and structures in Coos County, Oregon
1974 establishments in Oregon
North Bend, Oregon